African admixture in Europe refers to the presence of human genotypes attributable to periods of human population dispersals out of Africa in the genetic history of Europe. for example, certain Y-DNA and mtDNA lineages are thought to have spread from Northeastern Africa to the Near East during the later Pleistocene, and from there to Europe with the Neolithic Revolution. 

More recent African admixtureprimarily Berber admixture from North Africais associated with historic migrations through the Mediterranean Sea and the Muslim conquests of the Early Middle Ages. This admixture can be found primarily in western-southern Iberian peninsula and Southern Italy and the main islands, with the highest incidence being in Sicily.

Neolithic
The change from hunting and gathering to agriculture during the Neolithic Revolution was a watershed in world history. The societies that first made the change to agriculture are believed to have lived in the Middle East around 10,000 BCE. Agriculture was introduced into Europe by migrating farmers from the Middle East. According to the demic diffusion model, these Middle Eastern farmers either replaced or interbred with the local hunter-gather populations that had been living in Europe since the Out of Africa migration.

It has been suggested that the first Middle Eastern farmers reflected North African influences. There have been suggestions that some genetic lineages found in the Middle East arrived there during this period. The first agricultural societies in the Middle East are generally thought to have emerged after, and perhaps from, the Natufian culture between 12,000 and 10,000 BCE. The latter group was widely semi-sedentary even before the introduction of agriculture. An important migration from North Africa across the Sinai also appears to have occurred before the formation of the Natufian..

Historical period
In historical times, there has been a period of north African influence in southern Europe, especially western-southern Iberia and parts of southern Italy (namely Sicily), during various Muslim conquests. The genetic effect of this period on modern European populations is the subject of discussion (see below). In more recent history, the peoples of Europe and Africa came into contact during the exploration and colonization of Africa and as a consequence of the Atlantic slave trade.

Defining African admixture
Generally, markers and lineages used to characterize African admixture are those that are believed to be specific to Africa. There are also DNA polymorphisms that are shared between populations native to Europe, West Asia, North Africa and the Horn of Africa, such as the y-chromosomal haplogroup E1b1b and the mitochondrial haplogroup M1.

With regard to the paternal haplogroup E1b1b and maternal haplogroup M1, derivatives of these clades have been observed in prehistoric human fossils excavated at the Ifri n'Amr or Moussa site in Morocco, which have been radiocarbon-dated to the Early Neolithic period (ca. 5,000 BC). Ancient DNA analysis of these specimens indicates that they carried paternal haplotypes related to the E1b1b1b1a (E-M81) subclade and the maternal haplogroups U6a and M1, all of which are frequent among present-day communities in the Maghreb. These ancient individuals also bore an autochthonous Maghrebi genomic component that peaks among modern Berbers, indicating that they were ancestral to populations in the area. Additionally, fossils excavated at the Kelif el Boroud site near Rabat were found to carry the broadly-distributed paternal haplogroup T-M184 as well as the maternal haplogroups K1, T2 and X2, the latter of which were common mtDNA lineages in Neolithic Europe and Anatolia. These ancient individuals likewise bore the Berber-associated Maghrebi genomic component. This altogether indicates that the Late Neolithic Kelif el Boroud inhabitants were ancestral to contemporary populations in the area, but also likely experienced gene flow from Europe.

Other lineages that are now found in Africa and Europe may have a common origin in Asia (e.g. Y haplogroups R1, and some paternal haplogroup T and U subclades). One subclade of haplogroup U, namely U6a1, is known to have expanded from northern and eastern Africa back into Europe even though haplogroup U6 is considered to have originated in the Middle East. Other lineages are known to have moved from Europe directly into Africa, for example mitochondrial haplogroups H1 and H3. Such bidirectional migrations between Africa and Eurasia complicate the task of defining admixture.

Admixture

 There is a north–south cline of HapMap Yoruba haplotypes (YRI) in Europe. Southern and southwestern subpopulations had the highest proportion of YRI. This distribution is indicative of recurrent gene flow into Europe from the southwest and the Middle East. Haplotype sharing between Europe and the YRI are suggestive of gene flow from Africa, albeit from West Africa and not necessarily North Africa.
 Low levels of African admixture(2.8-10%) that were distributed along a north–south cline. The distribution of this African admixture mirrors the distribution of haplogroup E3b-M35(E1b1b).
A principal component analysis of data from the Human Genome Diversity Project detected a west-to-east gradient of Bantu-related ancestry across Eurasia. After the Out of Africa migration, there was most likely a later Bantu-related gene flow into Europe.
 Using genome-wide SNP data of over 2,000 individuals, the genomes of populations in southwestern Europe showed an average of 4% to 20% belonging to a Northwest African ancestral group, whereas populations in southeastern Europe had less than 2% of their genomes linked to this ancestral group. However, contrary to past autosomal studies and to what is inferred from Y-chromosome and mitochondrial haplotype frequencies (see below), it does not detect significant levels of Sub-Saharan ancestry in any European population outside the Canary Islands.
A panel of 52 AIMs was genotyped in 435 Italian individuals in order to estimate the proportion of ancestry from a three-way differentiation: Sub-Saharan Africa, Europe, and Asia. An autosomal basal proportion of Sub-Saharan ancestry is higher (9.2%, on average) than other central or northern European populations (1.5%, on average). The amount of African ancestry in Italians is however more comparable to (but slightly higher than) the average in other Mediterranean countries (7.1%). In northwestern Spain and in Portugal, Sub-Saharan autosomal ancestry is on average 7.1%. The authors argued that Sub-Saharan African admixture is also evident in uniparental markers, but only 1.2% mtDNA haplogroup L and no A, B or E(xE3b) Y-DNA haplogroups were found in Italy, which leads to an admixture estimate of 0.6%. The African admixture is higher in Northern and Central Italy rather than in Southern Italy, with an equally high amount in Britain and Japan. The use of AIMs instead of genome-wide data can lead to errors and overestimations of admixture. In a genome-wide analysis using 291,184 SNPs, it was found that Italians only have <1% of African admixture, while the British and Japanese have 0%.
 A prehistoric episode is the main contributor to the sub-Saharan presence in Mediterranean Europe and Iberia:
 Measures of genetic distance between Europe and Sub-Saharan are generally smaller than genetic distances between Africa and other continental populations. The relatively short genetic distance is likely due to prehistoric admixture.
 Many southern Europeans have inherited 1%–3% Sub-Saharan ancestry (3.2% in Portugal, 2.9% in Sardinia, 2.7% in southern Italy, 2.4% in Spain and 1.1% in northern Italy), although the percentages were lower (ranging from 0.2% in Sardinia and northern Italy to 2.1% in Portugal) when reanalyzed with the 'STRUCTURE' statistical model. An average mixture date of around 55 generations/1100 years ago was given, "consistent with North African gene flow at the end of the Roman Empire and subsequent Arab migrations".
 From an autosomal analysis, the average Northwest African influence is about 17% in Canary Islanders, with a wide interindividual variation ranging from 0% to 96%. The substantial Northwest African ancestry found for Canary Islanders supports the idea that, despite the aggressive conquest by the Spanish in the 15th century and the subsequent immigration, genetic footprints of the first settlers of the Canary Islands persist in the current inhabitants. Paralleling mtDNA findings, the largest average Northwest African contribution was found for the samples from La Gomera.

Y-DNA
One proposed example of Holocene gene flow from North Africa to Europe, via the Middle East, is thought to be E1b1b, which is thought to have emerged about 40,000 years ago in the Horn of Africa, and branches of it are thought to have migrated to the Middle East by 14,000 years ago during the late Pleistocene period.

Entering the late mesolithic Natufian culture, the E1b1b1a2 (E-V13) subclade has been associated with the spread of farming from the Middle East into Europe either during or just before the Neolithic transition. E1b1b1 lineages are found throughout Europe but are distributed along a south-to-north cline, with an E1b1b1a mode in the Balkans.

In separate migrations, E lineages in the form of the E1b1b1b subclade appear to have entered Europe from Northwest Africa into Iberia. In a sample of European males, haplogroup E was observed at a frequency of 7.2%. The timing of this movement has been given widely varying estimates. In much of Europe, frequencies of E lineages are very low, usually less than 1%. For example, the frequency of such lineages are at 2% in southern Portugal, 4% in northern Portugal, 2.9% in Istanbul, and 4.3% among Turkish Cypriots. E1b1a is closely related to E1b1b, the most frequent clade in Europe. E lineages that are not E1b1a or E1b1b could therefore reflect either a recent expansion associated with E1b1a or ancient population movements associated with E1b1b. For example, haplogroup E1a lineages have been detected in Portugal (5/553 = 1%), among Italians in Calabria (1/80=1.3%), and among Albanians in Calabria (2/68=2.9%).  The distribution of haplogroup E1a lineages in Portugal was independent of the distribution of the younger and more ubiquitous E1b1a. this distribution is consistent with a prehistoric migration from Africa to Iberia, possibly alongside mtDNA haplogroup U6. In Majorcans, Sub-Saharan Y-DNA lineage E-V38 was found at a total of 3.2% (2/62). Sub-Saharan Y-DNA lineages E3a, E1, BC*, (xE3), and E3* are found between 1 and 5% in Portugal, Valencia, Majorca, Cantabria, Málaga, Seville, and Galicia (Spain). In Sardinians, Sub-Saharan Y-DNA lineages A1b1b2b and E1a1 were found at a total of 1.0% (A1b1b2b 0.5% / E1a1 0.5%).

Haplogroups A and B are thought to have been the predominant haplogroups in central and southern Africa prior to the Bantu Expansion. Currently these haplogroups are less common than E lineages. In a sample of 5,000 African men, haplogroup A had a frequency of 5%. Haplogroup A has rare occurrences in Europe, but recently the haplogroup was detected in seven indigenous British males with the same Yorkshire surname.

The subclade E3b1 (probably originating in northeastern Africa) has a wide distribution in North Africa, the Horn of Africa, the Middle East, and Europe. This haplogroup, in Italy, is represented by E-M78, E-M123 and E-M81 (Figure 3) and reaches a frequency of 8% in northern and central Italy and slightly higher, 11%, in the south of that country.It has also been argued that the European distribution of E3b1 is compatible with the Neolithic demic diffusion of agriculture; thus, two subclades—E3b1a-M78 and E3b1c-M123—present a higher occurrence in Anatolia, the Balkans, and the Italian peninsula. Another subclade, E3b1b-M81 is associated with Berber populations and is commonly found in regions that have had historical gene flow with northern Africa, such as the Iberian Peninsula, the Canary Islands, and Sicily.

North African Y-DNA E-M81 was found at a total of 41.1% among "pasiegos" from Cantabria, Spain. That is the highest frequency observed in Europe to date. Estimates of Y-Chromosome ancestry vary. Using 1140 samples from throughout the Iberian peninsula, giving a proportion of 10.6% North African ancestry to the paternal composite of Iberians. From an analysis of the Y-chromosome with 659 samples from Southern Portugal, 680 from Northern Spain, 37 samples from Andalusia, 915 samples from mainland Italy, and 93 samples from Sicily found significantly higher levels of North African male ancestry in Portugal, Spain and Sicily (7.1%, 7.7% and 7.5% respectively) than in peninsular Italy (1.7%).Considering both some E-M78 subhaplogroups and the E-M81 haplogroup, the contribution of northern African lineages to the entire male gene pool of Iberia (barring Pasiegos), continental Italy, and Sicily can be estimated as 5.6%, 3.6%, and 6.6%, respectively. Y-DNA lineages E-V12 and E-V22 have been associated with a Levantine source (represented by modern Lebanese), while North African haplogroup E-M81 shows an average frequency of 1.53% in the current Sicilian and Southern Italian genetic pool, but the typical Maghrebin core haplotype 13-14-30-24-9-11-13 has been found in only two out of the five E-M81 individuals. These results, along with the negligible contribution from North-African populations revealed by the admixture-like plot analysis, suggest only a marginal impact of trans-Mediterranean gene flows on the current Sicilian and Southern Italian genetic pool.

mtDNA
Haplogroup L lineages are relatively infrequent (1% or less) throughout Europe with the exception of Iberia (Spain and Portugal), where frequencies as high as 22% have been reported, and some regions of Southern Italy, where frequencies as high as 2% and 3% have been found. About 65% of the European L lineages most likely arrived in rather recent historical times (Romanization period, Arab conquest of the Iberian Peninsula and Sicily, Atlantic slave trade) and about 35% of L mtDNAs form European-specific subclades, revealing that there was gene flow from Sub-Saharan Africa toward Europe as early as 11,000 years ago.

In Iberia the mean frequency of haplogroup L lineages reaches 3.83%; the frequency is higher in Portugal (5.83%) than in Spain (2.9% average), and without parallel in the rest of Europe. In both countries, frequencies vary widely between regions, but with increased frequencies observed for Madeira (insular Portugal), southern Portugal, Córdoba (southern Spain), Huelva (southern Spain), Canary Islands (insular Spain), Extremadura (western Spain) and Leon (western Spain). In the Autonomous regions of Portugal (i.e. Madeira and the Azores), L haplogroups constituted about 13% of the lineages in Madeira, significantly more than in the Azores. In the Canary Islands, frequencies have been reported at 6.6%. Regarding Iberia, current debates are concerned with whether these lineages are associated with prehistoric migrations, the Islamic occupation of Iberia, or the slave trade. African lineages in Iberia were predominantly the result of the Atlantic slave trade. Most of the L lineages in Iberia matched Northwest African L lineages rather than contemporary Sub-Saharan L lineages. This pattern indicates that most of the Sub-Saharan L lineages entered Iberia in prehistoric times rather than during the slave trade. According to Sub-Saharan lineages found in Iberia matched lineages from diverse regions in Africa. This pattern is more compatible with a recent arrival of these lineages after slave trading began in the 15th century. Alternative scenarios that invoke much older and demographically more significant introductions have been proposed or a substantial role of the Roman and/or Islamic periods on the introduction of Sub-Saharan lineages seem unlikely. Extracted DNA from human remains that were exhumed from old burial sites in Al-Andalus, Spain, The remains date to between the 12th and 13th centuries. The frequency of Sub-Saharan lineages detected in the medieval samples was 14.6% and 8.3% in the present population of Priego de Cordoba. The Muslim occupation and prehistoric migrations before the Muslim occupation would have been the source of these lineages. The highest frequencies of Sub-Saharan lineages found so far in Europe were observed in the comarca of Sayago (18.2%) which is "comparable to that described for the South of Portugal".

In Italy, haplogroup L lineages are present at lower frequencies than in Iberia and are detected only in certain regions: Latium, Volterra, Basilicata, and Sicily.

In eastern Europe, haplogroup L lineages are present at very low frequencies. Though a high diversity of African mtDNA lineages have been detected, few lineages have accumulated enough mutations in Europe to form monophyletic clusters. The monophyletic clusters L1b and L3b have an estimated age no greater than 6,500 years. African L1b, L2a, L3b, L3d and M1 clades in Slavic populations have been identified at low frequencies. L1b, L3b and L3d had matches with West African populations, indicating that these lineages probably entered Europe through Iberia. One lineage, L2a1a, found in Czechs and Slovaks, appeared to be much older, indicating that it may have entered Europe in prehistoric times. This clade is distinct from the branch of L2a1 called L2a1l2a that is found in individuals of Ashkenazi heritage from central and eastern Europe and less frequently in non-Jewish Poles. L2a lineages are widespread throughout Africa; as a result, the origins of this lineage are uncertain.

Haplogroup M1 is also found in Europe at low frequencies. Haplogroup M1 had a frequency of 0.3%. The origins of haplogroup M1 have yet to be conclusively established.

A prehistoric episode is likely to be the main contributor to the sub-Saharan presence in Mediterranean Europe.

Frequencies of haplogroup L lineages

In an analysis which also contains an admixture data but no cluster membership coefficients, shows little to no Sub-Saharan African influence in a wide array of European samples, i.e. Albanians, Austrians, Belgians, Bosnians, Bulgarians, Croatians, Cypriots, Czechs, Danes, Finns, Frenchmen, Germans, Greeks, Hungarians, Irish, Italians, Kosovars, Lithuanians, Latvians, Macedonians, Netherlanders, Norwegians, Poles, Portuguese, Romanians, Russians, Scots, Serbians, Slovaks, Slovenians, Spaniards, Swedes, Swiss (German, French and
Italian), Ukrainians, subjects of the United Kingdom, and Yugoslavians.

Haplogroup U6, to which a North African origin has been attributed, is largely distributed among Mozabites (28.2%) and Mauritanians (20%). In other northwest Africans, the frequency of U6 ranges from 4.2% in Tunisians to 8% in Moroccan Arabs. In Europe, U6 is most common in Spain and Portugal.

Frequencies of haplogroup U6 lineages

GM immunoglobulin allotypes
Further studies have shown that the presence of haplotype GM*1,17 23' 5* in southern Europe. This haplotype is considered a genetic marker of Sub-Saharan Africa, where it shows frequencies of about 80%. Whereas, in non-Mediterranean European populations, that value is about 0.3%, in Spain the average figure for this African haplotype is nearly eight times greater (though still at a low level) at 2.4%, and it shows a peak at 4.5% in Galicia. Values of around 4% have also been found in Huelva and in the Aran valley in the Pyrenees. Although some researchers have associated African traces in Iberia to Islamic conquest, the presence of GM*1,17 23' 5* haplotype in Iberia may in fact be due to more ancient processes as well as more recent ones through the introduction of genes from slaves sold from Africa..

In Sicily the North African haplotype Gm 5*;1;17; ranges from 1.56% at Valledolmo to 5.5% at Alia. The hypothesis is that the presence of this haplotype suggests past contacts with people from North Africa. The introduction of African markers could be due to the Phoenician colonization at the end of the second millennium B.C. or to the more recent Arab conquest (8th–9th centuries A.D.).

Paleoanthropology
The migration of farmers from the Middle East into Europe is believed to have significantly influenced the genetic profile of present-day Europeans. Some recent studies have focused on corroborating current genetic data with the archeological evidence from Europe, the Middle East, and Africa. The Natufian culture, which existed about 12,000 years ago, has been the subject of various archeological investigations, as it is generally believed to be the source of the European and North African Neolithic.

According to one hypothesis, the Natufian culture emerged from the mixing of two Stone Age cultures: (1) the Kebaran, a culture indigenous to the Levant, and (2) the Mushabian, a culture introduced into the Levant from North Africa†. It is suggested that the Mushabian culture originated in Africa, given that archeological sites with Mushabian industries in the Nile Valley predate those in the Levant†. The Mushabians would have then moved into the Sinai from the Nile Delta bringing with them their technologies†. The overpopulation in Northeast Africa contributed to the development of the Natufian adaptation, which  resulted in agriculture becoming a new way of sustenance.

From an analysis of human remains from the Natufian culture, there is evidence of Sub-Saharan influences in the Natufian samples. These influences would have been diluted by the interbreeding of the Neolithic farmers from the Near East are associted with the indigenous foragers in Europe. The Sub-Saharan influences detected in the Natufian samples with the migration of E1b1b lineages from Northeast Africa to the Levant and then into Europe.

According to an ancient DNA analyse on Natufian skeletal remains from present-day northern Israel, the Natufians in fact shared no evident genetic affinity to sub-Saharan Africans. It was not possible to test for affinity in the Natufians to early North African populations using present-day North Africans as a reference because present-day North Africans owe most of their ancestry to back-migration from Eurasia. The Natufians carried the Y-DNA (paternal) haplogroups E1b1b1b2(xE1b1b1b2a,E1b1b1b2b) (2/5; 40%), CT (2/5; 40%), and E1b1(xE1b1a1,E1b1b1b1) (1/5; 20%). In terms of autosomal DNA, these Natufians carried around 50% of the Basal Eurasian (BE) and 50% of Western Eurasian Unknown Hunter Gather (UHG) components. However, they were slightly distinct from the northern Anatolian populations that contributed to the peopling of Europe, who had higher Western Hunter-Gatherer (WHG) inferred ancestry. Natufians were strongly genetically differentiated from Neolithic Iranian farmers from the Zagros Mountains, who were a mix of Basal Eurasians (up to 62%) and Ancient North Eurasians (ANE). This might suggest that different strains of Basal Eurasians contributed to Natufians and Zagros farmers, as both Natufians and Zagros farmers descended from different populations of local hunter gatherers. Mating between Natufians, other Neolithic Levantines, Caucasus Hunter Gatherers (CHG), Anatolian and Iranian farmers is believed to have decreased genetic variability among later populations in the Middle East. The scientists suggest that the Levantine early farmers may have spread southward into East Africa, bringing along Western Eurasian and Basal Eurasian ancestral components separate from that which would arrive later in North Africa.

† The Mushabian industry is now known to have originated in the Levant from the previous lithic industries of the region of Lake Lisan. The Mushabian industry was originally thought to have originated in Africa because the microburin technique was not yet known to be much older in the eastern Levant. Currently there is no known industry to connect with the African migration that occurred 14,700 years ago, but it no doubt caused a population expansion in the Negev and Sinai which would not have accommodated an increase in population with the meager resources of a steppe/desert climate. Since all of the known cultures in the Levant at the time of the migration originated in the Levant and an archaeological culture cannot be associated with it, there must have been assimilation into a Levantine culture at the onset, most likely the Ramonian which was present in the Sinai 14,700 years ago.

See also 

African immigration to Europe (contemporary history)
Genetic history of the Middle East
Genetic history of North Africa
Genetic history of Europe
Barbary slave trade
Abkhazians of African descent

Notes

References

Further reading 

 
 

Europe, African Admixture In